Ellyas Pical (born 24 March 1960) was the first world boxing champion from Indonesia, and was three times IBF Super flyweight champion (1985–1989).

Life and career

In his childhood, Pical was a pearl diver, diving without equipment. Pical is of Ambonese/Moluccan heritage. Pical's nickname "The Exocet" was given by the press referring to his left-hand punch. The name comes from the French-made missiles used to against the Royal Navy by the Argentine Air Force during the Falklands War, which happened in 1982 during Pical's era. He got his title with this left-hand punch, knocking out defending champion Ju-Do Chun. At that time, Pical was only the second man from Indonesia to fight for a world title, following Thomas Americo (defeated by Saoul Mamby for the WBC Super lightweight title in Jakarta in 1981).

In 1987, after issues with his managers  Simson Tambunan and Anton Sihotang, as well as short-term managers Dali Sofari dan Khairus Sahel He eventually took singer Melky Goeslaw as his manager and Enteng Tanamal as assistant manager.

On February 28, 1987, he challenged the WBA title with Thai holder Khaosai Galaxy at Senayan Stadium, Jakarta. He was defeated by TKO (referee stoppage) in the 14th round.

Pical lives with his wife Rina Siahaya Pical, a dentist, and his sons Lorinly and Matthew. Pical was allegedly caught in the act of selling drugs to some undercover policemen in a discothèque in Jakarta during September 2005. This was shocking news to many Indonesians, as Pical had a reputation as a clean living and religious man. He was sentenced to seven months in prison, and released on 7 February 2006.  Pical currently works on the staff of KONI - Indonesian Olympic Committee.

Professional boxing record

See also 
List of super-flyweight boxing champions

References
Footnotes

Bibliography

External links

1960 births
Living people
Super-flyweight boxers
World super-flyweight boxing champions
International Boxing Federation champions
People from Saparua
Indonesian male boxers
Indonesian Christians